Bukovica is a village in the Municipality of Ivančna Gorica in central Slovenia. The area is part of the historical region of Lower Carniola. The municipality is now included in the Central Slovenia Statistical Region. It includes the hamlets of Brezovec, Cerovec, Gornji Vrh, Potok, and Ukajdol.

Name
Bukovica is a common toponym and oronym in Slovenia. It is derived from the adjective bukov 'beech' (from bukev 'beech tree') and originally referred to the local vegetation. In the past the German name was Bukowitz.

Church
The local church is dedicated to John the Baptist and belongs to the Parish of Šentvid pri Stični. It dates to the 15th century with some 17th-century remodelling.

References

External links

Bukovica on Geopedia

Populated places in the Municipality of Ivančna Gorica